In linear algebra, the eigengap of a linear operator is the difference between two successive eigenvalues, where eigenvalues are sorted in ascending order.

The Davis–Kahan theorem, named after Chandler Davis and William Kahan, uses the eigengap to show how eigenspaces of an operator change under perturbation. In spectral clustering, the eigengap is often referred to as the spectral gap; although the spectral gap may often be defined in a broader sense than that of the eigengap.

See also 
 Eigenvalue perturbation

References 

Linear algebra